El Socorro may refer to 

 Socorro, Santander (Colombia)
 El Socorro, Venezuela and its El Socorro Municipality
 El Socorro, Trinidad and Tobago
 Villa Angélica (Argentina)